Baughman may refer to:

People
 Baughman (surname)

Places

United States
 Baughman Settlement, West Virginia, an unincorporated community in Hardy County, West Virginia
 Baughman Township, Wayne County, Ohio, a township

Other uses
 The Baughman Center, two buildings (a chapel or pavilion and an administration building) on the campus of the University of Florida in Gainesville, Florida, in the United States
 Baughman Creek (Oregon), a stream located in Tillamook County, Oregon, in the United States
 , a United States Navy patrol vessel in commission from 1917 to 1918